Bodfari railway station was opened on 6 September 1869 by the Mold and Denbigh Junction Railway. Following the Railways Act 1921 the line became part of the LMS. The station was located to the west of the road bridge on the A541 close to the village. Station buildings were on the Chester bound platform and there was a shelter on the Denbigh platform. The station closed in April 1962.

The station site today is a private residence but the station building is still standing.

References

Further reading

External links 
 Caerwys station -  

Railway stations in Great Britain opened in 1869
Railway stations in Great Britain closed in 1962
Former London and North Western Railway stations
Disused railway stations in Denbighshire
Bodfari
1869 establishments in Wales